A Month of Sundays is a 2001 film directed by Stewart Raffill. It stars Rod Steiger in one of his final film roles and Sally Kirkland.

Filming took place in Los Angeles, California and began during April 2001,

Cast
 Rod Steiger as Charles McCabe
 Sally Kirkland as Katherine St. Croix 
 Michael Paré as Thomas McCabe
 Dee Wallace as Sarah McCabe
 Al Sapienza as Stephen McCabe
 Corina Marie as Biddy McCabe

Release 
A Month of Sundays premiered at the New York International Independent Film and Video Festival on September 17, 2001.

Reception 
A reviewer for The Palm Beach Post remarked that the film seemed "better suited for TV". Variety also reviewed the movie, calling it "a low-budget, cliche-ridden film featuring a roster of faded stars topped by Rod Steiger, as a sweet, stubborn but ailing grandfather searching for his long-lost son before he dies".

References

External links
 

2001 films
Films directed by Stewart Raffill
2001 drama films
American drama films
2000s English-language films
2000s American films